Devin Setoguchi (born January 1, 1987) is a Canadian former professional ice hockey right winger. Setoguchi is half-Yonsei (fourth-generation) Japanese Canadian and a Sports California/Sharks Playoff live TV analyst. He is known by the nickname The Gooch. He was drafted by the San Jose Sharks in the first round, eighth overall, in the 2005 NHL Entry Draft and has also played with the Minnesota Wild, Winnipeg Jets, and Calgary Flames. In September 2015, he failed to catch on with the Toronto Maple Leafs after being initially signed to a professional tryout (PTO) contract during training camp. He eventually signed with HC Davos of the Swiss National League A where he spent the 2015–16 season. In September 2016, he made the Los Angeles Kings out of training camp and signed a one-year, two-way contract for the 2016–17 season.

Playing career

Junior
Setoguchi played one season with the now-defunct Crowsnest Pass Timberwolves of the Alberta Junior Hockey League (AJHL). He then spent three seasons with the Saskatoon Blades of the Western Hockey League (WHL). In the 2005–06 season, he finished seventh in the league in scoring with 83 points. In the 2006–07 season, he joined the Prince George Cougars.

Professional

San Jose Sharks
Setoguchi was expected to begin the 2007–08 season in the NHL with the San Jose Sharks. However, he was injured and placed on injured reserve. He started the season with the Worcester Sharks, San Jose's American Hockey League (AHL) affiliate located in Worcester, Massachusetts. He played two games with Worcester before getting recalled to San Jose.

Setoguchi scored his first two regular-season NHL goals on October 29, 2007, in his first NHL game, playing against the Dallas Stars. He became the first Sharks rookie ever to score two goals in his first NHL game. On December 28, 2007, Setoguchi was re-assigned to Worcester.

On January 18, 2008, the Sharks recalled Setoguchi back to San Jose. The following day, San Jose lost to the Detroit Red Wings 6–3, in which Setoguchi scored a powerplay goal. On January 25, 2008, Setoguchi was sent back down to Worcester to get additional playing time during the NHL All-Star Game break, then recalled back to San Jose on January 28, 2008. On April 15, 2008, Setoguchi appeared in his first Stanley Cup playoff game, where he assisted on the game-tying goal in the third period. The Sharks went on to score one more goal to win that game.

During the 2008–09 season, Setoguchi spent most of his ice-time with teammates Joe Thornton and Patrick Marleau on San Jose's first line. On April 25, 2009, in the fifth game of the first round of the playoffs, Setoguchi scored his first playoff goal in the second period, helping the Sharks to a 3–2 victory over the Anaheim Ducks.

In the 2010–11 season with the Sharks, on February 19, 2011, Setoguchi scored his first ever NHL hat-trick in a 4–0 win against the Colorado Avalanche. On April 19, 2011, Setoguchi scored the game winner in overtime against the Los Angeles Kings to make the first-round playoff series two games to one. On May 4, 2011, Setoguchi completed a hat-trick in Game 3 of the Western Conference Semifinals against the Detroit Red Wings by scoring an overtime goal to give the Sharks a three games to none lead in the series.

Minnesota Wild
During the 2011 NHL Entry Draft, Setoguchi, along with Charlie Coyle and a first-round draft pick, was traded to the Minnesota Wild in exchange for Brent Burns and second-round pick in the 2012 NHL Entry Draft. This trade happened only one day after Setoguchi signed a three-year contract extension with the Sharks  On January 17, 2012, Setoguchi played his 300th career NHL game.

On November 6, 2012, Setoguchi signed with the Ontario Reign of the ECHL during the 2012–13 NHL lockout. Setoguchi was the first player on an NHL contract to join the Reign's roster. Setoguchi debuted with the Reign the next day against the San Francisco Bulls.

Winnipeg Jets and Calgary Flames
On July 5, 2013, Setoguchi was traded to the Winnipeg Jets for a second-round pick in the 2014 NHL Draft. In one season with the Jets, Setoguchi scored 27 points in 75 games.

On August 23, 2014, the Calgary Flames announced they had signed Setoguchi to a one-year contract. On November 27, 2014, after skating 12 NHL games with no points, Setoguchi cleared waivers and was assigned to the Adirondack Flames of the AHL. He remained with Adirondack for the remainder of the season, playing just 19 games and scoring 10 points.

HC Davos
The Flames did not offer a contract extension, and following the end of the 2014–15 season, he became an unrestricted free agent. On August 11, 2015, Glen Campbell of CTV Sports reported Setoguchi claims to have attended rehab and that he has been "clean and sober for five months" with hopes of signing with an NHL team. On August 24, 2015, the Toronto Maple Leafs reportedly signed him to a professional tryout contract. He was later released by the Leafs following the conclusion of training camp on September 27, 2015.

On October 6, 2015, he signed with HC Davos of the Swiss top-flight National League A (NLA). In the 2015–16 season, Setoguchi got his career back on track in contributing with 24 points in 30 games with Davos.

Los Angeles Kings
With the ambition to make a return to the NHL, Setoguchi returned as a free agent in the off-season to North America and agreed to a professional try-out contract with the Los Angeles Kings on September 7, 2016. After a successful training camp and pre-season, Setoguchi was signed by the Kings to a one-year, two-way contract on the eve of the 2016–17 season on October 11, 2016.

Adler Mannheim
On April 21, 2017, he signed with Deutsche Eishockey Liga (DEL) side Adler Mannheim, being handed an optional two-year contract by the Adler organization.

Career statistics

Regular season and playoffs

International

Awards and honours

References

External links
 

1987 births
Living people
Adirondack Flames players
Adler Mannheim players
Calgary Flames players
Canadian expatriate ice hockey players in Germany
Canadian ice hockey right wingers
Canadian sportspeople of Japanese descent
Crowsnest Pass Timberwolves players
Ice hockey people from Alberta
Los Angeles Kings players
Minnesota Wild players
National Hockey League first-round draft picks
Ontario Reign (AHL) players
Ontario Reign (ECHL) players
People from Taber, Alberta
Prince George Cougars players
San Jose Sharks draft picks
San Jose Sharks players
Saskatoon Blades players
Winnipeg Jets players
Worcester Sharks players